Jangipur may refer to:

In Uttar Pradesh 
Jangipur, Ghazipur, a town in Ghazipur district, Uttar Pradesh
Jangipur, Jaunpur, a village in Jaunpur district, Uttar Pradesh
Jangipur, Uttar Pradesh Assembly constituency, a constituency of Uttar Pradesh Legislative Assembly

In West Bengal 
Jangipur district, a proposed district to be created in Malda division, West Bengal
Jangipur subdivision, an administrative subdivision in Murshidabad district, West Bengal
Jangipur, Murshidabad, a town in Murshidabad district, West Bengal
Jangipur police district, a police district in Murshidabad district, West Bengal
Jangipur, West Bengal Assembly constituency, a constituency of West Bengal Legislative Assembly